Berens River First Nation is a First Nations band government in Manitoba, Canada. The First Nation has two reserves: Berens River 13 and Pigeon River 13A, located in the boreal forest east of Lake Winnipeg. The First Nation is governed by a chief and five councillors.

Berens River is a member of the Southeast Resource Development Council with offices in Winnipeg. This Tribal Council has 9 member First Nations.

The settlement of Berens River, Manitoba, with a population of 111 people in 2011 borders the main settlement of Berens River 13 with a population of 1,028 in 2011. The two communities create a population centre, also called Berens River, at the mouth of the Berens River. Both are served by the Berens River Airport.

History
The river Berens River was originally called Pigeon River and the name Pigeon River was given to the next river to the south.

Demographics
As of February 2015, the registered membership of the Berens River First Nation was 3,246 with 2,110 members living on-reserve and 1,136 members off-reserve.

The settlement of Berens River 13 had a population of 1,028 in 2011.

Territory

Berens River First Nation has two reserves.
Pigeon River 13A is   along the Pigeon River located south of the Berens River.

Notable people 
Jacob Berens [Nah-wee-kee-sick-quah-yash] (c1832 – 1916)
 William Berens [Tabasigizikweas] (1866–1947)
 Jamie Leach, ice hockey player who played for the 1992 Pittsburgh Penguins  Stanley Cup champions
 Reggie Leach, Canadian ice hockey player, Stanley Cup winner, NHL All-Star and 1976 Canada Cup champion for team Canada.

References

External links
 Berens River First Nation
 Map of Berens River 13 at Statcan

Southeast Resource Development Council
First Nations in Eastman Region, Manitoba
First Nations in Northern Region, Manitoba